Two Bicycles is a self-released studio album from Maine's Nesey Gallons. It was put together in a limited edition, CD-R format of Eyes & Eyes & Eyes Ago with homemade packaging along with Somewhere We Both Walk. It was recorded when Gallons was eighteen years old.

Track listing
 "Cold Weather Bring Your Arms"  – 5:03
 "Lonesome Death"  – 1:51
 "If I Were You"  – 2:36
 "Planes Reminiscings"  – 4:34
 "Bicycle Laughing Street" – 5:25
 "I've Been So Blue"  – 7:27
 "Januaries Januaries"  – 9:10
 "What Next What Now"  – 2:57
 "Traintrack Laughter" - 5:51
 "Horseshoe Throwers Blues (Pianolessly)"  – 4:30
 "'Don't Go to the Ocean Without Me'"  – 9:47
 "Oh Moon" - 7:23 
 "On Sleepy Islands" - 5:17
 "Black Clouds" - 3:52

2009 debut albums
Nesey Gallons albums